Cory Bartholomew Redding (born November 15, 1980) is a former American football defensive tackle. He was drafted by the Detroit Lions in the third round of the 2003 NFL Draft and played college football at Texas. Redding also played for the Seattle Seahawks, Baltimore Ravens, Indianapolis Colts  and Arizona Cardinals.

Early years
He was born in Houston, Texas, the son of Carl Benjamin Redding and Mary Zerlene Brantley.

Redding played football at North Shore High School. In his senior year in 1999, he was named USA Today's Defensive Player of the Year and was a consensus All-American choice. He also excelled in track and field, winning the state Class 5A title in the discus as a junior and senior (career best toss of 193'9").

College career
Redding played college football for the Texas Longhorns at the University of Texas. During his four years there, he was a two-time All-Big 12 Conference selection and played in every game, including a string of 35 consecutive starts on the defensive line.

He finished his collegiate career with 201 tackles (123 solos), 21 sacks (174 yards), and 53 tackles for a loss totaling 249 yards (third on the school's career-record list).

Professional career

Detroit Lions
In the 2003 NFL Draft Redding was drafted by the Detroit Lions in the 3rd round (66th overall).

He became the starter at left defensive end prior to the 2004 season. In 2005, he played in all 16 games and set a career-high with 42 tackles (29 solo). He emerged in 2006 as one of the best inside pass-rushers in the NFL after moving from defensive end to tackle.

On February 22, 2007, the Lions placed the franchise tag on Redding and he was designated as the team's non-exclusive franchise player. On July 16, the Lions and Redding agreed to a seven-year, $49 million contract. The deal included over $16 million in guaranteed money. The move came amid a bit of controversy, as it made Redding the highest paid defensive end in the league.

Redding was placed on season-ending injured reserve with injuries to his knee and groin on December 12, 2008.

Seattle Seahawks
On March 14, 2009, Detroit traded him and a 2009 fifth-round draft pick to the Seattle Seahawks for linebacker Julian Peterson. He was expected to play defensive end on 1st and 2nd downs and play defensive tackle on 3rd downs for extra pass rush.

Baltimore Ravens
Redding signed a two-year contract with the Baltimore Ravens on March 22, 2010.

Redding intercepted a tipped pass by Drew Brees in a week 15 game against the New Orleans Saints on December 19, 2010 to help seal a big win for the Ravens.  It was his first career interception. Redding recorded three sacks on the season. In a divisional playoff game against the Pittsburgh Steelers on January 15, 2011, Redding scored his first career touchdown after recovering a fumble by Ben Roethlisberger.

Redding had another solid season in 2011, recording 4 sacks and helping the Ravens defense allow the 2nd fewest yards in the league.

Indianapolis Colts
Redding signed with the Indianapolis Colts on March 14, 2012.

Arizona Cardinals
Redding signed with the Arizona Cardinals on March 11, 2015. On October 11, 2015, Redding had an interception against the Detroit Lions that he returned 30 yards. On December 27, 2015, Redding returned an Aaron Rodgers fumble 36 yards for a score against the Green Bay Packers.

In the last game of the regular season against the Seahawks, Redding injured his ankle and was put on Injured Reserve, missing the rest of that game and the playoffs.  He was subsequently released on April 18, 2016. He retired on June 29, 2016.

References

External links
Arizona Cardinals bio
Indianapolis Colts bio
Seattle Seahawks bio

1980 births
Living people
Players of American football from Houston
American football defensive ends
American football defensive tackles
Texas Longhorns football players
Detroit Lions players
Seattle Seahawks players
Baltimore Ravens players
Indianapolis Colts players
Arizona Cardinals players
North Shore Senior High School (Texas) alumni
Ed Block Courage Award recipients